Elsworth Wood is a  biological Site of Special Scientific Interest between Cambourne and Elsworth in Cambridgeshire.

This site has three different uncommon types of woodland. It is mainly coppiced field maple, with a varied shrub layer and the ground flora is mainly dog's mercury and bluebells, together with a considerable population of oxlips. There are several nationally uncommon beetles, such as the rove beetle Stichoglossa semirufa.

The site is private land with no public access.

References

Sites of Special Scientific Interest in Cambridgeshire